Keezhukara,  a small village in Pathanamthitta district, is about 135 km from Thiruvanandapuram, capital city of Kerala, India. It is on latitude 9.349 N and longitude 76.705 E. Pampa River is on the north and west. Kozhencherry is in the south and Melukara in the east. The Interior is hilly but the riverine land is flat, fertile and arable. The population of Keezhukara in 2008 was 1211 in 292 households.

History
In olden days, Keezhukara was a jungle where wild animals roamed freely around. The last wild animal to leave was the jackals whose howling could be heard even in the fifties of the last century. There had been no permanent settlements. A footpath parallel to the river went all the way from Niranam to Nilakkal. Remnants of that path are still visible in Keezhukara. This path had been used to bring jungle produce to the riverside for transporting by country crafts to Niranam, the nearest port of trade at that time. The common items brought for trade were pepper, Cinnamon, cardamom, ginger, sandalwood, teak, rosewood, peacocks, Ape, parrot, snakes and ivory.

Before the eighteenth century, there were no proper roads in Kerala.  The only route connecting various places was the rivers and the mode of travel was by country boats. At Madathil Kadavu (Madathil ghat), the river is very wide. Here the river that flows from the east to west turns ninety degrees and flows to the south. During summer season a very large area of dry sand-bed would surface. So it was a very convenient place for boats-men to land and lodge. Temporary thatched sheds for resting spots and eating shops would sprout up along the river bank to cater for the weary travelers and merchants. Till the middle of the twentieth century, such coffee shops were a common sight at Madathil Kadavu.

By the eighteenth century, Keezhukara was a well settled peaceful village. They were hardworking middle-class people, who lived a simple life close to nature and earned their living mostly by subsistence farming and small trade. The people were either Hindus or Saint Thomas Christians. They respected each other and considered others as equals. There is a Hindu temple on the top of Iruppakattu para (Iruppakattu rock). Christians were worshipping at Niranam Orthodox church till they had their own church at nearby Kozhencherry.

This village was under a Brahmin Illam (house). Every year taxes were to be paid to Thirumeni, head of the Illam, in kind, usually the produce of the land like paddy, coconuts etc. This tax collection continued till the 1950s.

Roads
The ancient Pandalam-Sabarimala route cuts through Kozhencherry. By 1900 there were two jungle paths from Kozhencherry to Keezhukara Madathil Kadavu.

Originating at Kozhencherry junction of the Sabarimala route, the path crossed the Mannoorethu property and Kozhencherry (old) church.  On the eastern side of the church property, there stood a granite stone gateway. Climbing down the steps through the gateway led to Mulayodil paddy fields. From there the path was a small ridge through the fields. In front of Kureekkattil property, the path crossed a canal into solid ground. A narrow canal led to Iruppakattu para (rocks). Halfway up the rock, there was a level ground. Walking a few meters, there was another steep slippery rock (where Mar Thoma Christians built a prayer hall, a YMCA building and a primary school).  Crossing this rock would take you to Panthradil property. From there, jumping from one stone to another and climbing down a few steps, one would reach the level ground. This footpath then joined with a path that went all the way from Madathil kadavu to Melukara. When new houses were built on the eastern side of the hill, a new path was formed from Iruppakattu para to circumnavigate this rocky hill.

During rainy season, the above path was difficult to use, a straight new path through the hilly area was formed from Kozhencherry to Road Kadavu. By the beginning of the twentieth century, this road was widened so that bullock-carts could come up to the village. Between 1947 and 1950 a new road was built from Kozhencherry Market to Neduvelil Junction under the leadership of Mannil Mathew (Pappy).

Buildings
Keezhukara YMCA Public Library is one of the oldest public library in Kerala.  A branch of the YMCA had been built as a memorial to Rev. P.E.Mathew, Palakunnathu Neduvelil, on the eastern side of the village.  A prayer hall that was near the YMCA Library was demolished in 1960s.  The primary school building and property were given to the Government of Travancore, with a condition that the school building will allowed to be used for Mar Thoma Sunday School classes on Sundays.  St.Mary’s Girls’ school provided education for girls who lived within a 10 km radius.

Till 1947, almost all the houses had only thatched roof. A normal house was made of wood, a granary in the middle and two bed rooms on its sides. A long open verandah in front would serve as guest room, living room and bedroom. Under the granary was an underground cell. At its back, was a paddy pounding room that also served as a storage room for farm products. The kitchen was on one side of the house under a sloping shed. The thattinpuram (garret) was used as a storage space.  Electricity had reached Keezhukara by 1953.

Palliyodams (Snake boats)

Aranmula by river is about 5 km from Keezhukara. Palliyodams are Aranmula’s unique snake boats (Chundan Vallam) which devotees of Lord Parthasarathy hold in reverence, considering it as the divine vessel of the presiding deity in Sree Parthasarathy temple. Palliyodams belong to different karas (villages) in Pathanamthitta District.

N.S.S. Karayogam No: 717 is the owner of the Keezhukara Palliyodam and it is controlled by a Palliyoda Samrakshana Samithi (snake boat maintenance committee). One of the  unique features of Keezhukara palliyodam is that it is a symbol of cordial, gracious and amiable relationship between people of different religious beliefs living in Keezhukara. From its construction to its launching and its participation in every year in the festivities, the people of this village take active interest. If it wins a prize the whole village rejoices and celebrates. Aranmula regatta (Vallam Kali) is part of the cultural heritage of Kerala state as a whole and Aranmula in particular. Keezhukara is proud of its participation in this great and unique event.

References

Villages in Pathanamthitta district